Hydaticus aruspex is a species of predaceous diving beetle in the family Dytiscidae. It is found in North America and the Palearctic.

References

Further reading

External links

 

Dytiscidae
Articles created by Qbugbot
Beetles described in 1864